In music, 17 tone equal temperament is the tempered scale derived by dividing the octave into 17 equal steps (equal frequency ratios).

17-ET is the tuning of the regular diatonic tuning in which the tempered perfect fifth is equal to 705.88 cents, as shown in Figure 1 (look for the label "17-TET").

History and use
Alexander J. Ellis refers to a tuning of seventeen tones based on perfect fourths and fifths as the Arabic scale. In the thirteenth century, Middle-Eastern musician Safi al-Din Urmawi developed a theoretical system of seventeen tones to describe Arabic and Persian music, although the tones were not equally spaced. This 17-tone system remained the primary theoretical system until the development of the quarter tone scale.

Notation

Easley Blackwood Jr. created a notation system where sharps and flats raised/lowered 2 steps.
This yields the chromatic scale:
C, D, C, D, E, D, E, F, G, F, G, A, G, A, B, A, B, C
Quarter tone sharps and flats can also be used, yielding the following chromatic scale:
C, C/D, C/D, D, D/E, D/E, E, F, F/G, F/G, G, G/A, G/A, A, A/B, A/B, B, C

Interval size
Below are some intervals in 17-EDO compared to just.

Relation to 34-ET
17-ET is where every other step in the 34-ET scale is included, and the others are not accessible. Conversely 34-ET is a subdivision of 17-ET.

References

Sources

External links 
 "The 17-tone Puzzle — And the Neo-medieval Key that Unlocks It" by George Secor
 Libro y Programa Tonalismo, heptadecatonic system applications (in Spanish)
 Georg Hajdu's 1992 ICMC paper on the 17-tone piano project
 , by Wongi Hwang

Equal temperaments
Microtonality